Alfonso Zamora Quiroz (born 9 February 1954) is a Mexican former professional boxer who competed from 1973 to 1980. He was the Lineal and WBA bantamweight champion, and made five title defenses. As an amateur, he won a silver medal in the bantamweight event at the 1972 Munich Olympics.

Amateur career
Bantamweight silver medalist at the 1972 Summer Olympics in Munich. Results were:
Defeated Ricardo Fortaleza (Philippines) KO 2
Defeated Stefan Forster (West Germany) points
Defeated Juan Francisco Rodríguez (Spain) KO 3
Defeated Ricardo Carreras (U.S.) points
Lost to Orlando Martinez (Cuba) points

Professional career

World Bantamweight Championship
He won the Lineal and WBA Bantamweight title on 14 March 1975 when he knocked out Soo-Hwan Hong in four rounds, two years after turning pro. Zamora defended his title twice that year via knockout, against Thanomchit Sukhothai and Socrates Batoto. On April 3, 1976, he knocked out future hall-of-famer Eusebio Pedroza in the second round. Later that year, he successfully defended his title via knockout against Gilberto Illueca and a rematch with Soo-Hwan Hong.

Zamora vs. Zarate

Fighting contemporaneously, and holding the WBC crown, was the fellow-Mexican legend, Carlos Zárate Serna. A showdown between the two was inevitable and they met in a non-title match on 23 April 1977.  Zamora went into the bout sporting a record of 29 wins in 29 fights, all by knockout. Zarate's record was an equally impressive 45 fights, 45 wins, with 44 KOs. In a largely anticipated fight Zarate scored a technical knockout over Zamora in the fourth round.

Zamora never seemed to recover from this loss.  In his next fight he lost his Lineal and WBA Bantamweight titles to Jorge Luján by knockout in the tenth round. His record thereafter was spotty, and he even was stopped on 16 November 1979 by Eddie Logan, who sported a record of 5 wins and 7 losses.  He retired after losing, again by knockout, to Rigoberto Estrada on 19 September 1980. In 1983, Zamora was to fight Wilfredo Gómez, the fight ultimately was canceled.

Zamora was a knockout seeker, but he seemed to lose confidence after his devastating loss to Zarate. Nevertheless, he was selected at Number 47 on The Ring list of 100 greatest punchers of all time. His final career record included 33 wins, with 32 KOs, and 5 losses.

Professional boxing record

See also
List of world bantamweight boxing champions
List of Mexican boxing world champions

References

External links

Alfonso Zamora - CBZ Profile

 

1954 births
Living people
Mexican male boxers
Boxers from Mexico City
Olympic boxers of Mexico
Olympic silver medalists for Mexico
Boxers at the 1972 Summer Olympics
Olympic medalists in boxing
Medalists at the 1972 Summer Olympics
World bantamweight boxing champions
World Boxing Association champions
The Ring (magazine) champions